Vitreolina aurata is a species of sea snail, a marine gastropod mollusk in the family Eulimidae.

References

aurata
Gastropods described in 1920